VIP Brother 9, also known as Любовта е във VIP Brother (lit. Love is in the VIP Brother) was ninth season of the Bulgarian reality television series VIP Brother, hosted by Niki Kanchev. The show launched on 11 September 2017 on Nova TV. Niki Kanchev, Aleksandra Sarchadjieva and Miglena Angelova are the main presenters. It concluded 61 days later on 10 November 2017. Yonislav Yotov "Toto" won with Margarita Hranova as the runner-up.

Housemates
16 housemates entered the house on Day 1. They were joined by 2 other housemates on Day 2, who were allowed by Big Brother to participate as a single contestant on Day 11.

Aleksandra B. 
Aleksandra Bogdanska is a model, TV host and the former girlfriend of Daniel P. She entered the house on Day 1 and finished fourth in the finale on Day 61.

Aleksandra D. 
Aleksandra Dimitrova "Aleks" is a pop singer, known for being a contestant on the second season of X Factor. She and Vladislava are twin sisters. Aleksandra D. entered the house on Day 2. The twin sisters entered the house as single contestants. On Day 8, Vladislava faced a fake eviction. She was offered by Big Brother to return to the house to perform secret missions for him with Aleks. During their secret task, it was Aleks's identity, under which they had to live - Vladi was with the other housemates, pretending to be Aleks, while Aleks was in the secret room of the house. The twins were swapping their places in the house and their task was to trick the others that they were one and the same person. If the girls failed with their assigned task, they would be immediately evicted from the show. Aleksandra D. and Vladislava failed with their secret mission. Despite that, Big Brother let them stay in the house and they were given the opportunity to compete as a single contestant. The twins are the first housemates of the season to be evicted, on Day 15.

Alfredo 
Alfredo Tores is a dancer and choreographеr. He entered the house on Day 1 and was the sixth evicted on Day 50.

Енджи 
Angie Kassabie is a nutritionist. She was born in Lebanon. She entered the house on Day 1 and was the tenth evicted on Day 59.

Anton 
Anton Stefanov is a journalist. He entered the house on Day 1 and was the third evicted on Day 29.

Boris 
Boris Petrov is a famous cook. He entered the house on Day 1 and was the eighth evicted on Day 57.

Danail 
Danail Milev "Dani" is a pop singer, musician, composer and lyricist. He entered the house on Day 1 and was the second evicted on Day 22.

Daniel P. 
Daniel Petkanov is a reporter of the Nova TV show "Chasat na Milen Tsvetkov" ("Milen Tsvetkov's Hour") and the former boyfriend of Aleksandra B. He entered the house on Day 1 and was the eleventh evicted on Day 59.

Daniel Z. 

Daniel Zlatkov is a footballer who plays as a defender for Shakhtyor Soligorsk in the Belarusian Premier League. He is also known as the Bulgarian version of Ronaldo, because he looks like the famous footballer. He entered the house on Day 1 and was the seventh evicted on Day 57.

Djuliana 
Djuliana Gani is a model and the winner of the title "Miss Silicone 2013". She entered the house on Day 1 and finished fifth in the finale on Day 61.

Margarita 

Margarita Hranova is a famous pop singer. She entered the house on Day 1 and finished second in the finale on Day 61.

Maria 

Maria Kirova is a pop-folk singer. She entered the house on Day 1 and decided to walk out of the house on Day 22.

Miglena 
Miglena Kakanasheva "Megz" is a fashion designer. She is also known for being a contestant on the reality show The Mole 1. She entered the house on Day 1 and finished third in the finale on Day 61.

Sashka 
Sashka Vaseva is a pop-folk singer. She entered the house on Day 1 and was the ninth evicted on Day 59.

Tsvetelin 
Tsvetelin Marinov "Tsuni" is a businessman. He entered the house on Day 1 and was the fourth evicted on Day 36.

Vanya 

Vanya Shtereva is an actress, singer and writer. She entered the house on Day 1 and was the fifth evicted on Day 43.

Vladislava 
Vladislava Dimitrova "Vladi" is a pop singer, known for being a contestant on the second season of X Factor. She and Aleksandra D. are twin sisters. Vladislava entered the house on Day 2. The twin sisters entered the house as single contestants. On Day 8, Vladi faced a fake eviction. She was offered by Big Brother to return to the house to perform secret missions for him with Aleks. During their secret task, it was Aleks's identity, under which they had to live - Vladi was with the other housemates, pretending to be Aleks, while Aleks was in the secret room of the house. The twins were swapping their places in the house and their task was to trick the others that they were one and the same person. If the girls failed with their assigned task, they would be immediately evicted from the show. Aleksandra D. and Vladislava failed with their secret mission. Despite that, Big Brother let them stay in the house and they were given the opportunity to compete as a single contestant. The twins became the first housemate to be evicted on Day 15.

Yonislav 
Yonislav Yotov "Toto" is a rap and R&B singer and Youtuber. He is also known as the member of the R&B and rap duet Skandau. He entered the house on Day 1 and became the winner on Day 61.

Nominations table

Notes

 : On Day 2, the twin sisters Aleksandra D. and Vladislava entered the house. Aleksandra B. and Yonislav were given a mission by Big Brother to recognize them as the newly welcomed housemates. They completed their task successfully, which meant that the twin sisters were automatically nominated for eviction. Aleksandra B. and Yonislav were part of "The Order of the Heart" along with Angie and Daniel Z. who won the first-week mission. Maria and Sashka were nominated after the decision of "The Order of the Heart".
 : On Day 8, there was a fake eviction of which the housemates were unaware about. Vladislava received the fewest votes to save and therefore she was invited by Big Brother to return to the house to perform secret missions for him with her twin sister. During their secret task, it was Aleks's identity, under which they had to live - Vladi was with the other housemates, pretending to be Aleks, while Aleks was in the secret room of the house. The twins were swapping their places in the house and their task was to trick the others that they were the same person. Eventually, Vladislava was exempt from the nominations during the second week, while Aleks was eligible to nominate. If the girls failed with their assigned task, they would be immediately evicted from the show.
 : On Day 11, it was revealed that Aleksandra D. and Vladislava had failed with their secret mission. Despite that, Big Brother let them stay in the house and they were given the opportunity to compete as a single contestant. However, due to the failure in their secret mission, they were directly up for eviction along with Anton, Boris and Miglena.
: Boris was immune and he couldn't nominate during the fourth nominations. The other housemates couldn't nominate him as well.
: This time, the housemates were eligible to nominate only one housemate instead of two. Originally, 8 out of 14 housemates were nominated and those housemates were Anton, Daniel Z., Dzhuliana, Miglena, Sashka, Tsvetelin and Vanya. Miglena, who had the role of an executive director during the new weekly mission "BBTV", was eligible to save two of the nominated housemates from the possible eviction. She chose to save Daniel Z. and herself. 
: The fifth nominations were face-to-face. The housemates were obliged to nominate only one housemate and everyone who received at least one nomination faced eviction.
: Alfredo's nomination to Daniel P. was voided because he didn't give a reason to nominate him. 
: Originally, 7 out of 12 housemates were nominated and those housemates were Alfredo, Boris, Daniel Z., Angie, Miglena, Vanya and Yonislav. As Aleksandra B. and Daniel P. were planning a marriage in the house, they were the lucky housemates who had the opportunity to save two of the nominees. A "wheel of luck" was introduced which featured the 7 nominated housemates. The wheel was spun by Aleksandra and Daniel and it revealed Boris and Daniel Z. as the two saved housemates from the sixth eviction.
: Miglena was immune and she couldn't nominate during the seventh nominations. The other housemates couldn't nominate her as well.
: Yonislav's nomination to Alfredo was voided because he didn't give a reason to nominate him.
: During the eighth and final nominations, the housemates had to choose the housemate they wanted to win (the name in ) and the housemate who they didn't want to win (the name in black). They were able to vote for themselves.
: The public were voting to win rather than to save.

References

External links
 Official website

2017 Bulgarian television seasons
VIP 9
2017 Bulgarian television series endings